Danni König (born 17 December 1986) is a retired Danish professional footballer.

Career 
Born in Tingbjerg, König played as a youth player with Brønshøj BK U-19 team before signing with the Brønshøj BK pro team in 2005. He played with them for four years before being traded to Randers FC in 2009. In April 2010, he signed with Valur before re-signing with Brønshøj BK in August 2010. He signed with FC Vestsjælland in 2011. On 26 July 2013, König was loaned back to Brønshøj BK. His loan ended on 31 December 2013.

König signed with Oklahoma City Energy FC on 12 February 2015. He was named USL Player of the Week for the week of 7 April 2015.

On 10 May 2017, König was traded from Oklahoma City Energy to FC Cincinnati in exchange for Andy Craven. On 25 October 2017, the club confirmed that König would return for the 2018 season.

König signed with Danish 1st Division club Lyngby BK on 31 January 2019 for six months. He left the club at the end of the season.

On 7 July 2019, Brønshøj BK announced that König had returned to the club. On 10 January 2020 it was confirmed, that he had left the club and would retire from football.

References

External links 

1986 births
Living people
Danish men's footballers
Danish expatriate men's footballers
OKC Energy FC players
FC Cincinnati (2016–18) players
Brønshøj Boldklub players
Randers FC players
Valur (men's football) players
FC Vestsjælland players
Lyngby Boldklub players
Danish Superliga players
Danish 1st Division players
Danish 2nd Division players
USL Championship players
Association football forwards
Danish expatriate sportspeople in Iceland
Danish expatriate sportspeople in the United States
Expatriate footballers in Iceland
Expatriate soccer players in the United States
Footballers from Copenhagen